Allen Phillips Griffiths (11 June 1927 - 1 December 2014) was a Welsh  professor and snuff enthusiast.

Life
Griffiths was born in Llandaff, in Cardiff, Wales. He studied at University College, Cardiff until 1943. After the Second World War he enlisted in military service. During his time in the military, he was stationed in the Middle East. Afterwards receiving a B.Phil at Oxford. He first taught at University College of Wales, Aberystwyth, before moving to Birkbeck College in 1957.

In 1964, Griffiths became a founding professor of the University of Warwick. At the time, he was the youngest professor of philosophy in the UK.

Career

Snuff

Death

Works
 Of liberty (1983)
 (ed.) Philosophy and literature (1984)
 (ed.) A.J. Ayer: Memorial Essays (1992)
 Impulse to Philosophise (1993)
 Philosophy, psychology and psychiatry (1994)
 Philosophy and practice (2011)

References

External links 

 "Do we know what knowing is?" (video) Godfrey Vesey introduces a discussion between Martha Kneale and Griffiths as to whether knowledge can be satisfactorily defined as justified true belief (Open University, 1972).

20th-century Welsh educators
Welsh philosophers
Academics of Aberystwyth University
1927 births
2014 deaths